Telesecundaria is a system of distance education programs for secondary and high school students created by the government of Mexico and available in rural areas of the country as well as Central America, South America, Canada and the United States via satellite (Solidaridad 1 and Satmex 5).

Background
Telesecundaria was born on the need to service graduates of elementary education in rural areas that were unable to continue their studies for lack of secondary schools in their areas. In 1968 Telesecundaria started at 304 classrooms and a teacher for each one of these in the states of Veracruz, Morelos, Estado de México, Puebla, Tlaxcala, Hidalgo, Oaxaca and the Federal District. The initial number of students was 6 549.

 Secundaria general – General studies
 Secundaria para trabajadores – for working students
 Secundaria tecnológica industrial – industrial technology
 Secundaria tecnológica agropecuaria – agricultural technology
 Secundaria tecnológica pesquera – fishing technology

Originally, Telesecundaria transmitted black-and-white live lessons through public television channels but nowadays the lessons have been pre-recorded to ensure higher quality, images are in color and transmitted via satellite. Content now includes education on values, good habits, skills and aptitudes. By the end of 1993, Telesecundaria was broadcasting to over 9,000 schools in Mexico, serving almost 600,000 students via satellite through Morelos II. In 1994, Edusat was launched, making use of the more powerful and advanced satellite, (Solidaridad 1) capable of transmitting 24 hours a day and covering more areas.

Service
Each facility has at least one television set, a satellite dish, a set-top box and a low noise amplifier.

Telesecundaria broadcasts more than 4,000 television programs on channel 11 of the six channels of Edusat (Sistema de Televisión Educativa, "Educational Television System") of the Ministry of Public Education (SEP, Secretaría de Educación Pública) of Mexico to more than 16,000 rural facilities serving more than one million students nationwide. The programs are transmitted daily between 8 a.m. and 2 p.m. (Mexico City time) and re-transmitted between 2 p.m. and 8 p.m. Monday through Friday. From 8 a.m. to 3 p.m. on Saturdays programs pertaining high school education are transmitted. Programming is complemented with general-interest, continuing education, and other shows about traditions and customs of the states of Mexico. For educators, audio visual content on each area of knowledge is provided for them, as well as the Experiencias Compartidas ("Shared Experiences") show.

International expansion

Central America
In 1996, the head of the SEP and the ministers of Education of Central America agreed to start experimental projects of Telesecundarias for every country. Since this year, the following countries in Central America are served by Telesecundaria:

Source Ministry of Public Education of Mexico

United States
There are currently pilot programs available in the states of California, Colorado, Pennsylvania, Oregon and Florida.

See also
 Education in Mexico

External links
 Telesecundaria at the United Nations Educational, Scientific and Cultural Organization
 Current trends of Edusat
  Telesecundaria at Edusat
  Telesecundaria at the Ministry of Public Education (SEP)
  Telesecundaria at CiberHábitat, the Information Technology for children site of the government of Mexico
  La Red Edusat y sus contribución a la educación en México y América Latina'' The Edusat Network and it contribution in the education in Mexico and Latin America
  Telesecundaria in Costa Rica
  Telesecundaria  site of the telesecundarias's teachers of Mexico

1968 establishments in Mexico
Distance education institutions based in Mexico

Central American culture
Governmental educational technology organizations